Baranof Lake is a glacially-fed, horseshoe-shaped lake on the eastern side of Baranof Island, in Alaska.  Baranof Lake borders the community of Baranof Warm Springs and also has a Forest Service cabin on the northwestern end of the lake. Baranof River flows into the lake's western end and exits on the eastern end in rapids and a waterfall.

Baranof Lake was likely named for the community of Baranof Warm Springs.

References

External links

Lakes of Alaska
Lakes of Sitka, Alaska
Glacial lakes of the United States